What Ever Happened to Timi is a 2014 Hungarian comedy film directed by Attila Herczeg.

References

External links 

2014 comedy films
Hungarian comedy films